Nick Jr. is a South African pay television channel owned by Paramount Networks EMEAA. It launched on 30 September 2014, along with sister channel Nicktoons, North Africa receives the Arabic-Language version of the channel Nick Jr. MENA.

Unlike other feeds, the end credits on shows are replaced with short credits including the show name, production year and production company and the promos and bumpers do not contain any text other than the Nick Jr. logo. since launch.

History
Before its launch, all Nick Jr. programming was broadcast on Nickelodeon.

A Nick Jr. block began airing on Nicktoons in 2017, airing every morning and sometime in 2020 on Nickelodeon.

The channel also has an Ethiopian feed.

Programming
44 Cats
The Adventures of Paddington
Abby Hatcher
Anna & Friends
Baby Shark's Big Show!
Barbapapa: One Big Happy Family! 
Ben & Holly's Little Kingdom
Blaze and the Monster Machines
Blue's Clues & You!
Bubble Guppies
Butterbean's Café
Corn & Peg
Deer Squad
Dora and Friends: Into the City!
Dora the Explorer
Fresh Beat Band of Spies
Go, Diego, Go!
Nella the Princess Knight
PAW Patrol
Peppa Pig
Santiago of the Seas
Shimmer and Shine
Sunny Day
Top Wing

References

Africa
Television channels and stations established in 2014
Television stations in South Africa